Phyllonorycter armeniella is a moth of the family Gracillariidae. It is known to be from Armenia and Turkey.

The larvae feed on Salix species. They mine the leaves of their host plant.

References

armeniella
Moths of Asia
Moths described in 1958